Horagala East Grama Niladhari Division is a Grama Niladhari Division of the Padukka Divisional Secretariat  of Colombo District  of Western Province, Sri Lanka .  It has Grama Niladhari Division Code 464.

Horagala East is a surrounded by the Pahala Millewa North, Kotigamgoda, Dampe, Kurugala, Horagala West, Horakandawala, Madulawa North and Madulawa South  Grama Niladhari Divisions.

Demographics

Ethnicity 

The Horagala East Grama Niladhari Division has a Sinhalese majority (96.5%) . In comparison, the Padukka Divisional Secretariat (which contains the Horagala East Grama Niladhari Division) has a Sinhalese majority (95.8%)

Religion 

The Horagala East Grama Niladhari Division has a Buddhist majority (96.3%) . In comparison, the Padukka Divisional Secretariat (which contains the Horagala East Grama Niladhari Division) has a Buddhist majority (94.6%)

Grama Niladhari Divisions of Padukka Divisional Secretariat

References